Stephen Mosher Wood (June 10, 1832 – December 24, 1920) was an American politician. 
Mr. Wood represented Chase County, Kansas in the Kansas House of Representatives in 1871 and 1875, and was a member of the Kansas Senate in 1876 after replacing S. R. Peters who resigned.

Early life and family
Stephen Mosher Wood was born at Mount Gilead, Ohio, June 10, 1832, to David and Esther Ward (Mosher) Wood. Mr. Wood married Caroline Halsey Breese on May 22, 1853, and was the father of Wallace Alfred Wood, Clarence David Wood, Carrie Wood and Sidney Breese Wood.

Military career
During the Civil War, Stephen M. Wood was a First lieutenant in the 6th Missouri Volunteer Cavalry as part of his brother, Samuel Newitt Wood's Battalion and later was Brigade Commissary of Subsistence in the Department of the Gulf.

Legacy
Stephen M. Wood was appointed a Regent of the Kansas State Agricultural College in 1877, and reappointed in 1880.
Mr. Wood also donated the land for the State YMCA camp south of Elmdale, Kansas which now bears his name.

References

External links
 http://www.campwood.org/about/

People from Mount Gilead, Ohio
People from Chase County, Kansas
1832 births
1920 deaths
People of Kansas in the American Civil War
Republican Party members of the Kansas House of Representatives
Republican Party Kansas state senators